Kandha (also Romanized as Kandhā and Kandehā; also known as Gandāb, Kendāb, and Qandāb) is a village in Khorram Dasht Rural District, Kamareh District, Khomeyn County, Markazi Province, Iran. At the 2006 census, its population was 91, in 21 families.

References 

Populated places in Khomeyn County